The Convention for the Unification of certain rules relating to international carriage by air, commonly known as the Warsaw Convention, is an international convention which regulates liability for international carriage of persons, luggage, or goods performed by aircraft for reward.

Originally signed in 1929 in Warsaw (hence the name), it was amended in 1955 at The Hague, Netherlands, and in 1971 in Guatemala City, Guatemala. United States courts have held that, at least for some purposes, the Warsaw Convention is a different instrument from the Warsaw Convention as amended by the Hague Protocol.

The Montreal Convention, signed in 1999, replaced the Warsaw Convention system in countries ratifying it.

History
On 17 August 1923, the French government proposed the convening of a diplomatic conference In November 1923 for the purpose of concluding a convention relating to liability in international carriage by air. The conference was formally deferred on two occasions due to reluctant behavior of the governments of various nations to act on such a short notice without the knowledge of the proposed convention. Finally, between 27 October and 6 November, the first conference met in Paris to study the draft convention. Since most of the participants were diplomats accredited to the French government and not professionals, it was agreed unanimously that a body of technical, legal experts be set up to study the draft convention prior to its submission to the diplomatic conference for approval. Accordingly, the International Technical Committee of Legal Experts on Air Questions (Comité International Technique d’Experts Juridiques Aériens, CITEJA) was formed in 1925. In 1927–28 CITEJA studied and developed the proposed draft convention and developed it into the present package of unification of law and presented it at the Warsaw Conference, where it was approved between 4 and 12 October 1929. It unified an important sector of private air law.

The convention was written originally in French and the original documents were deposited in the archives of the Ministry for Foreign Affairs of Poland. After coming into force on 13 February 1933, it resolved some conflicts of law and jurisdiction.

Between 1948 and 1951 it was further studied by a legal committee set up by the International Civil Aviation Organization (ICAO) and in 1952 a new draft was prepared to replace the convention. However it was rejected and it was decided that the convention be amended rather than replaced in 1953. The work done by the legal committee at the Ninth Session was presented to the International Conference on Air Law which was convened by the council of the ICAO and met at The Hague from 6 to 28 September 1955. The Hague Conference adopted a Protocol (the Hague Protocol) for the amendment of the Warsaw Convention. Between the parties of the Protocol, it was agreed that the 1929 Warsaw Convention and the 1955 Hague Protocol were to be read and interpreted together as one single instrument to be known as the Warsaw Convention as amended at the Hague in 1955. This was not an amendment to the convention but rather a creation of a new and separate legal instrument that is only binding between the parties. If one nation is a party to the Warsaw Convention and another to the Hague Protocol, neither state has an instrument in common and therefore there is no mutual international ground for litigation.

Finally, the Montreal Convention, signed in 1999, replaced the Warsaw Convention system.

Content
There are five chapters:
Chapter I – Definitions
Chapter II – Documents of Carriage; Luggage and Passenger Ticket
Chapter III – Liability of the Carrier
Chapter IV – Provisions Relating to Combined Carriage
Chapter V – General and Final Provisions

In the convention there is a provision of successive carriage and a combined carriage partly by air and partly by other modes of transport as well.

In particular, the Warsaw Convention:
Defines "international carriage" and the convention's scope of applicability
Sets rules for documents of carriage
Sets rules for the air carrier's liability and limitations thereof
Sets rules for legal jurisdiction
Mandates carriers to issue passenger tickets;
Requires carriers to issue baggage checks for checked luggage;
Creates a limitation period of two years within which a claim must be brought (Article 29); and
Limits a carrier's liability to at most:
 250,000 Francs or 16,600 special drawing rights (SDR) for personal injury;
 250 Francs or 19 SDR per kilogram for checked luggage and cargo, or US$20 per kilogram for non-signatories of the amended Montreal Convention; 
 5,000 Francs or 332 SDR for the hand luggage of a traveller.

The sums limiting liability were originally given in gold francs (defined in terms of a particular quantity of gold by article 22 paragraph 5 of the convention). These sums were amended by the Montreal Additional Protocol No. 2 to substitute an expression given in terms of SDRs. These sums are valid in the absence of a differing agreement (on a higher sum) with the carrier. Agreements on lower sums are null and void.

A court may also award a claiming party's costs, unless the carrier made an offer within 6 months of the loss (or at least 6 months before the beginning of any legal proceedings) which the claiming party has failed to beat.

The Warsaw Convention provides that a plaintiff can file a lawsuit at his or her discretion in one of the following forums:
 The carrier's principal place of business
 The domicile of the carrier
 The carrier's place of business through which the contract was made
 The place of the destination

According to Clauses 17 and 18 of the Warsaw Convention, airline companies are liable for any damage that occurs to passengers or their belongings during in-flight. However, airline companies will not be held responsible if the damage results from the passenger's own fault or one of their temporary servants such as doctors assisting ill passengers on their own initiative (Clause 20). To be covered by air carriers, doctors should respond to the captain's call when it comes to assisting ill passengers. In such cases, doctors are considered an airline's temporary servants who acted on the airline's instructions. Major airlines are all covered by insurance to meet such contingencies and to cover doctors who act as their temporary agents.

Ratifications
As of 2015, the Warsaw Convention had been ratified by 152 states. The protocol to the convention had been ratified by 137 states.

See also
Aviation law
CMR Convention
Hague Protocol
Kenneth Macdonald Beaumont
Montreal Convention

References

External links

Airline tickets
International Civil Aviation Organization treaties
History of Warsaw
Treaties concluded in 1929
Treaties concluded in 1971
Treaties entered into force in 1933
Treaties entered into force in 1973
Treaties of the Kingdom of Afghanistan
Treaties of Algeria
Treaties of Angola
Treaties of Argentina
Treaties of Armenia
Treaties of Australia
Treaties of Austria
Treaties of Azerbaijan
Treaties of the Bahamas
Treaties of Bahrain
Treaties of Bangladesh
Treaties of Barbados
Treaties of the Byelorussian Soviet Socialist Republic
Treaties of Belgium
Treaties of the Republic of Dahomey
Treaties of Bolivia
Treaties of Bosnia and Herzegovina
Treaties of Botswana
Treaties of Vargas-era Brazil
Treaties of Brunei
Treaties of the People's Republic of Bulgaria
Treaties of Burkina Faso
Treaties of Cambodia
Treaties of Cameroon
Treaties of Canada
Treaties of Cape Verde
Treaties of Chile
Treaties of the People's Republic of China
Treaties of Colombia
Treaties of the Comoros
Treaties of the Republic of the Congo
Treaties of Costa Rica
Treaties of Ivory Coast
Treaties of Croatia
Treaties of Cuba
Treaties of Cyprus
Treaties of the Czech Republic
Treaties of Czechoslovakia
Treaties of North Korea
Treaties of the Republic of the Congo (Léopoldville)
Treaties of Denmark
Treaties of the Dominican Republic
Treaties of Ecuador
Treaties of the Republic of Egypt (1953–1958)
Treaties of El Salvador
Treaties of Equatorial Guinea
Treaties of Estonia
Treaties of the Ethiopian Empire
Treaties of Fiji
Treaties of Finland
Treaties of the French Third Republic
Treaties of Gabon
Treaties of Nazi Germany
Treaties of Ghana
Treaties of the Kingdom of Greece
Treaties of Guatemala
Treaties of Guinea
Treaties of Honduras
Treaties of the Kingdom of Hungary (1920–1946)
Treaties of Iceland
Treaties of India
Treaties of Indonesia
Treaties of Pahlavi Iran
Treaties of Ba'athist Iraq
Treaties of the Irish Free State
Treaties of Israel
Treaties of the Kingdom of Italy (1861–1946)
Treaties of Japan
Treaties of Jordan
Treaties of Kenya
Treaties of Kuwait
Treaties of Kyrgyzstan
Treaties of the Kingdom of Laos
Treaties of Latvia
Treaties of Lebanon
Treaties of Lesotho
Treaties of Liberia
Treaties of the Kingdom of Libya
Treaties of Liechtenstein
Treaties of Luxembourg
Treaties of Madagascar
Treaties of Malawi
Treaties of Malaysia
Treaties of the Maldives
Treaties of Mali
Treaties of Malta
Treaties of Mauritania
Treaties of Mauritius
Treaties of Mexico
Treaties of the Mongolian People's Republic
Treaties of Montenegro
Treaties of Morocco
Treaties of Myanmar
Treaties of Nauru
Treaties of Nepal
Treaties of the Netherlands
Treaties of New Zealand
Treaties of Nicaragua
Treaties of Niger
Treaties of Nigeria
Treaties of Norway
Treaties of Oman
Treaties of Pakistan
Treaties of Panama
Treaties of Papua New Guinea
Treaties of Paraguay
Treaties of Peru
Treaties of the Philippines
Treaties of the Second Polish Republic
Treaties of the Estado Novo (Portugal)
Treaties of Qatar
Treaties of Moldova
Treaties of the Kingdom of Romania
Treaties of the Soviet Union
Treaties of Rwanda
Treaties of Samoa
Treaties of Saudi Arabia
Treaties of Senegal
Treaties of Serbia and Montenegro
Treaties of Seychelles
Treaties of Sierra Leone
Treaties of Singapore
Treaties of Slovakia
Treaties of Slovenia
Treaties of the Solomon Islands
Treaties of South Africa
Treaties of Spain under the Restoration
Treaties of the Dominion of Ceylon
Treaties of Saint Vincent and the Grenadines
Treaties of the Democratic Republic of the Sudan
Treaties of Suriname
Treaties of Sweden
Treaties of Switzerland
Treaties of Syria
Treaties of North Macedonia
Treaties of Togo
Treaties of Tonga
Treaties of Trinidad and Tobago
Treaties of Tunisia
Treaties of Turkey
Treaties of Turkmenistan
Treaties of Uganda
Treaties of the Ukrainian Soviet Socialist Republic
Treaties of the United Arab Emirates
Treaties of the United Kingdom
Treaties of Tanzania
Treaties of the United States
Treaties of Uruguay
Treaties of Uzbekistan
Treaties of Vanuatu
Treaties of Venezuela
Treaties of Vietnam
Treaties of Yemen
Treaties of the Kingdom of Yugoslavia
Treaties of Zambia
Treaties of Zimbabwe
1929 in aviation
1929 in Poland
Treaties extended to Norfolk Island
Treaties extended to Curaçao and Dependencies
Treaties extended to Greenland
Treaties extended to the Faroe Islands
Treaties extended to Bermuda
Treaties extended to the British Antarctic Territory
Treaties extended to the Cayman Islands
Treaties extended to the Turks and Caicos Islands
Treaties extended to Akrotiri and Dhekelia
Treaties extended to the Falkland Islands
Treaties extended to Montserrat
Treaties extended to Saint Helena, Ascension and Tristan da Cunha
Liability treaties
Treaties extended to Netherlands New Guinea
Treaties extended to the Territory of New Guinea
Treaties extended to the Territory of Papua
Treaties extended to the Colony of the Bahamas
Treaties extended to the Colony of Barbados
Treaties extended to French West Africa
Treaties extended to the Bechuanaland Protectorate
Treaties extended to Brunei (protectorate)
Treaties extended to French Cameroon
Treaties extended to French Equatorial Africa
Treaties extended to British Cyprus
Treaties extended to the Belgian Congo
Treaties extended to the Colony of Fiji
Treaties extended to the Dutch East Indies
Treaties extended to the Emirate of Transjordan
Treaties extended to British Kenya
Treaties extended to French Indochina
Treaties extended to Basutoland
Treaties extended to the Federated Malay States
Treaties extended to the Crown Colony of Malta
Treaties extended to British Burma
Treaties extended to the Nauru Trust Territory
Treaties extended to the Colony and Protectorate of Nigeria
Treaties extended to Ruanda-Urundi
Treaties extended to the Colony of Sierra Leone
Treaties extended to the British Solomon Islands
Treaties extended to British Ceylon
Treaties extended to the Kingdom of Tonga (1900–1970)
Treaties extended to the Crown Colony of Trinidad and Tobago
Treaties extended to the British Windward Islands
Treaties extended to the British Leeward Islands
Treaties extended to British Dominica
Treaties extended to the Gilbert and Ellice Islands
Treaties extended to the Crown Colony of Seychelles
Treaties extended to Southern Rhodesia
Treaties extended to Northern Rhodesia
Treaties extended to British Hong Kong
Treaties extended to Portuguese Macau
Conferences in Warsaw
October 1929 events
1920s in Warsaw